The Rhodes 19 is an American trailerable day sailer or sailing dinghy, that was designed by Philip Rhodes as a one-design racer and first built in 1958.

The Rhodes 19 shares the same hull design as the 1962 Mariner 19.

Production
The design was built by O'Day Corp and later by Stuart Marine in the United States. It remains in production, with 3,200 boats completed.

Design
The Rhodes 19 traces its linage to the 1945 Hurricane 19 sailboat design. The Hurricane 19 was constructed of moulded plywood, had an open cockpit and was initially built by the Allied Aviation Corporation. Another boat builder, Palmer Scott, purchased some incomplete Hurricane hulls and modified them with a foredeck, a cuddy cabin and a fixed keel, marketing the resultant boat as the Smyrna. Marscot Plastics used one of the wooden Smyrnas as a plug to build a mold from and created a fiberglass version, which became the Rhodes 19.

The Rhodes 19 is a recreational sailboat, built predominantly of fiberglass, with wood trim. It has a fractional sloop rig with aluminum spars, including an optional tapered mast. The hull has a raked stem, a plumb transom, a transom-hung rudder controlled by a tiller and a fixed fin keel or centerboard.

The design has sleeping accommodation for two people in the cuddy cabin and includes a built-in icebox.

For sailing the design has cockpit space for six to eight people. It is equipped with a stern-mounted mainsheet traveler, adjustable jib leads and foam flotation for safety.

Variants
Rhodes 19
This keelboat model displaces  and carries  of iron ballast. The boat has a Portsmouth Yardstick DP-N racing average handicap of 99.0. The fixed keel Rhodes 19 is the only variant used for class racing.
Rhodes 19 CB
This centerboard sailing dinghy model displaces  and carries no ballast. The rudder is a "kick-up" design. The boat has a Portsmouth DP-N racing average handicap of 97.4.

Operational history
The boat has an active class club, the Rhodes 19 Class Association, that organizes racing.

In a 1994 review Richard Sherwood wrote, "a Sail magazine 'breakthrough boat' with tremendous influence upon sailing, the Rhodes 19 is the first popular day sailer. Centerboard and keel versions are available, with the former found mostly on lakes and the latter in coastal waters ... The 19 is actively raced."

See also
List of sailing boat types

Related development
Mariner 19

References

External links

Keelboats
Dinghies
1950s sailboat type designs
Sailing yachts
Trailer sailers
Sailboat type designs by Philip Rhodes
Sailboat types built by O'Day Corp.
Sailboat types built by Stuart Marine